John Miljan (November 9, 1892 – January 24, 1960) was an American actor. He appeared in more than 200 films between 1924 and 1958.

Biography
Born in 1892, Miljan was the tall, smooth-talking villain in Hollywood films for almost four decades, beginning in 1923. Miljan made his first sound film in 1927 in the promotional trailer for The Jazz Singer, inviting audiences to see the upcoming landmark film. In later years he played imposing, authoritative parts such as high-ranking executives and military officers. He is best remembered as General Custer in Cecil B. DeMille's film The Plainsman. DeMille also cast him in two notable supporting roles in two of his biblical epics: the Danite elder Lesh Lakish in Samson and Delilah (1949), and the blind Israelite grandfather in The Exodus in The Ten Commandments (1956).

Miljan died from cancer in Hollywood in 1960, aged 67. He was married to Victoire Lowe and adopted her two sons from her first marriage to actor Creighton Hale.

Selected filmography

 Love Letters (1924) as Thomas Chadwick
 The Lone Chance (1924) as Lew Brody
 Romance Ranch (1924) as Clifton Venable
 Empty Hearts (1924) as Frank Gorman
 The Painted Lady (1924) as Carter
 On the Stroke of Three (1924) as Henry Mogridge
 Sackcloth and Scarlet (1925) as Samuel Curtis
 Silent Sanderson (1925) as Jim Downing
 The Phantom of the Opera (1925) as Valentin (uncredited)
 The Overland Limited (1925) as Brice Miller
 Wreckage (1925) as Maurice Dysart
 Sealed Lips (1925) as George Garnett
 The Unnamed Woman (1925) as Archie Wesson
 The Unchastened Woman (1925) as Lawrence Sanbury
 Morals for Men (1925) as Leonard Wallace
 Flaming Waters (1925) as Jasper Thorne
 The Devil's Circus (1926) as Lieberkind
 Brooding Eyes (1926) as Drummond
 Lucky Fool (1926)
 Footloose Widows (1926) as Mr. Smith
 Race Wild (1926)
 Devil's Island (1926) as André Le Févier
 The Amateur Gentleman (1926) as Viscount John Devenham
 The Men Women Love (1926) as Eduardo
 Unknown Treasures (1926) as Ralph Cheneey
 Almost a Lady (1926) as Henri
 My Official Wife (1926) as Nicholas
 Wolf's Clothing (1927) as Johnson Craigie
 The Final Extra (1927) as Mervin Le Roy
 Quarantined Rivals (1927) as Ed, the barber
 The Yankee Clipper (1927) as Paul de Vigny
 The Ladybird (1927) as Jules Ranier
 Paying the Price (1927) as Michael Donovan
 Lovers (1927) as Alvarez
 Rough House Rosie (1927) as Lew McKay
 Framed (1927) as Lola's Husband
 Old San Francisco (1927) as Don Luis (uncredited)
 What Happened to Father? (1927) as Victor Smith
 The Satin Woman (1927) as Maurice
 Stranded (1927) as Grant Payne
 The Desired Woman (1927) as Lieutenant Kellogg
 The Clown (1927) as Bert Colton
 A Sailor's Sweetheart (1927) as Mark
 The Jazz Singer (1927) as Host (uncredited)
 Sailor Izzy Murphy (1927) as The lunatic
 The Silver Slave (1927) as Philip Caldwell
 The Slaver (1927) as Cyril Blake
 Husbands for Rent (1927) as Hugh Frazer
 The Little Snob (1928) as Walt Keene
 Tenderloin (1928) as Bank Teller
 The Crimson City (1928) as Gregory Kent
 Glorious Betsy (1928) as Preston
 Lady Be Good (1928) as Murray
 Women They Talk About (1928) as Officer
 The Terror (1928) as Alfred Katman
 Land of the Silver Fox (1928) as James Crawford
 The Home Towners (1928) as Joe Roberts
 Stark Mad (1929) as Dr. Milo
 The Eternal Woman (1929) as Gil Martin
 Queen of the Night Clubs (1929) as Grant - Lawyer
 Hardboiled Rose (1929) as Steve Wallace
 The Desert Song (1929) as Capt. Fontaine
 Voice of the City (1929) as Dapper Don Wilkes
 Innocents of Paris (1929) as Monsieur Renard
 Fashions in Love (1929) as Frank Martin
 Speedway (1929) as Lee Renny
 The Unholy Night (1929) as Major Mallory
 Times Square (1929) as Dick Barclay
 Untamed (1929) as Bennock
 Devil May Care (1929) as Lucien DeGrignon
 The Woman Racket (1930) as Chris
 Not So Dumb (1930) (uncredited)
 Free and Easy (1930) as himself - Actor in Bedroom Scene
 Show Girl in Hollywood (1930) as Frank Buelow - The Director
 In Gay Madrid (1930) as Armada - the Torero (uncredited)
 The Unholy Three (1930) as Prosecuting Attorney
 The Sea Bat (1930) as Juan
 Our Blushing Brides (1930) as Martin W. Sanderson
 War Nurse (1930) as French Medical Officer (uncredited)
 Remote Control (1930) as Doctor Leonard T. Kruger
 Paid (1930) as Inspector Burke
 Great Day (1930)
 The Great Meadow (1931) as Daniel Boone (uncredited)
 Inspiration (1931) as Henry Coutant, the Sculptor
 Gentleman's Fate (1931) as Florio
 The Secret Six (1931) as Joe Colimo
 Iron Man (1931) as Paul H. Lewis
 Politics (1931) as Jim Curango
 Son of India (1931) as Juggat
 Susan Lenox, Her Fall and Rise (1931) as Wayne Burlingham
 Hell Divers (1931) as Lt. Commander Jack Griffin
 Possessed (1931) as John Driscoll
 West of Broadway (1931) as Norm
 Emma (1932) as District Attorney
 The Beast of the City (1932) as District Attorney
 Arsène Lupin (1932) as Prefect of Police
 The Wet Parade (1932) as Major Doleshal
 Are You Listening? (1932) as Ted Russell
 Night Court (1932) as Crawford
 The Rich Are Always with Us (1932) as Greg Grannard
 Unashamed (1932) as District Attorney Harris
 Prosperity (1932) as Holland
 The Kid from Spain (1932) as Pancho
 Flesh (1932) as Joe Willard
 Made on Broadway (1933)
 Whistling in the Dark (1933) as Charlie
 What! No Beer? (1933) as Butch Lorado
 The Nuisance (1933) as John Calhoun
 Blind Adventure (1933) as Regan
 The Way to Love (1933) as Marco
 The Mad Game (1933) as William Bennett
 Twin Husbands (1933) as Jerry Van Trevor / Jerry Werrenden
 King for a Night (1933) as Walter Douglas
 The Sin of Nora Moran (1933) as Paulino
 Madame Spy (1934) as Weber
 The Poor Rich (1934) as Prince Abdul Hamidshan
 Whirlpool (1934) as Barney Gaige
 The Line-Up (1934) as Reginald Fields
 Unknown Blonde (1934) as Frank Wilson
 Young and Beautiful (1934) as Gordon Douglas
 Belle of the Nineties (1934) as Ace Lamont
 Tomorrow's Youth (1934) as Thomas Hall Sr.
 The Ghost Walks (1934) as Prescott Ames
 Charlie Chan in Paris (1935) as Albert Dufresne
 Mississippi (1935) as Major Patterson
 Under the Pampas Moon (1935) as Graham Scott
 Three Kids and a Queen (1935) as Boss Benton
 Murder at Glen Athol (1936) as Bill Holt
 Sutter's Gold (1936) as Gen. Juan Bautista Alvarado
 Private Number (1936) as Stapp
 The Gentleman from Louisiana (1936) as Baltimore
 North of Nome (1936) as Dawson
 The Plainsman (1936) as Gen. George A. Custer
 Arizona Mahoney (1936) as Cameron Lloyd
 Of Human Hearts (1938)
 Man-Proof (1938) as Tommy Gaunt
 Border G-Man (1938) as Louis Rankin
 If I Were King (1938) as Thibaut D'Aussigny
 Ride a Crooked Mile (1938) as Lt. Col. Stuart
 Pardon Our Nerve (1939) as Duke Page
 The Oklahoma Kid (1939) as Ringo (the lawyer)
 Juarez (1939) as Mariano Escobedo
 Torchy Runs for Mayor (1939) as Dr. Dolan
 Fast and Furious (1939) as Eric Bartell
 Emergency Squad (1940) as Slade Wiley
 Women Without Names (1940) as John Marlin, Asst Dist. Attey.
 Queen of the Mob (1940) as Pan
 New Moon (1940) as Pierre Brugnon
 Young Bill Hickok (1940) as Nicholas Tower
 Texas Rangers Ride Again (1940) as Carter Dangerfield
 The Cowboy and the Blonde (1941) as Bob Roycroft
 Double Cross (1941) as Nick Taggart
 Forced Landing (1941) as General Valdane
 The Deadly Game (1941) as Henri Franck
 Riot Squad (1941) as Jim Grosso
 Obliging Young Lady (1942) as George Potter
 True to the Army (1942) as Drake
 North of the Rockies (1942) as Lionel Morgan
 The Big Street (1942) as McWhirter (uncredited)
 Criminal Investigator (1942) as Edward Judson
 Scattergood Survives a Murder (1942) as Rolfe
 The Boss of Big Town (1942) as Kenneth Craige
 Submarine Alert (1943) as Mr. Bambridge / Capt. Haigas
 Bombardier (1943) as Chaplain Charlie Craig
 The Fallen Sparrow (1943) as Inspector 'Toby' Tobin
 The Iron Major (1943) as Oregon State Coach (uncredited)
 Bride by Mistake (1944) as Major Harvey
 The Merry Monahans (1944) as Arnold Pembroke, Has-Been Matinee Idol
 I Accuse My Parents (1944) as Dan Wilson
 It's in the Bag! (1945) as Mr. Arnold
 Back to Bataan (1945) as Gen. Jonathan Wainwright ('Skinny') (uncredited)
 Wildfire (1945) as Pete Fanning
 Lost City of the Jungle (1946, Serial) as Dr. Gaffron
 The Last Crooked Mile (1946) as Police Lt. Mayrin
 The Killers (1946) as Jake the Rake (uncredited)
 White Tie and Tails (1946) as Mr. Latimer
 Sinbad the Sailor (1947) as Moga
 Queen of the Amazons (1947) as narrator / Col. Jones
 That's My Man (1947) as Secretary
 Unconquered (1947) as Prosecutor at Court-Martial (uncredited)
 The Flame (1947) as Detective
 Perilous Waters (1948) as Carter Larkin
 Adventure in Baltimore (1949) as Mr. Eckert
 Stampede (1949) as T.J. Furman
 Samson and Delilah (1949) as Lesh Lakish
 Mrs. Mike (1949) as Mr. Howard
 Mule Train (1950) as Judd Holbrook (uncredited)
 Walk Softly, Stranger (1950) as Old Man (uncredited)
 M (1951) as Blind Balloon Vendor
 Anything Can Happen (1952) as Indian (scenes deleted)
 Bonzo Goes to College (1952) as Wilbur Crane
 The Savage (1952) as Chief White Thunder (uncredited)
 Fort Algiers (1953) as Arab Chieftain (uncredited)
 Pirates of Tripoli (1955) as Malek
 Run for Cover (1955) as Mayor Walsh
 The Wild Dakotas (1956) as Antelope
 The Ten Commandments (1956) as The Blind One
 The Lone Ranger and the Lost City of Gold (1958) as Chief Tomache (final film role)
 Dead Men Don't Wear Plaid (1982) (in "The Killers") (archive footage)

References

External links

1892 births
1960 deaths
20th-century American male actors
American male film actors
American male silent film actors
Deaths from cancer in California
Male actors from South Dakota
People from Lead, South Dakota